The Shoot, known in Japan as Shooting Studio, is a 2010 Rail shooter video game for the PlayStation 3, which uses the PlayStation Move controllers. It is developed by Cohort Studios and published by Sony Computer Entertainment for release in North America on 19 October 2010, Europe on 29 October 2010 and Japan on 27 January 2011. It was officially unveiled at the 2010 Game Developers Conference in San Francisco.

Setting
Players in the game have to help film a series of Hollywood action films, thus the players have takes rather than lives in the game. The game's story consists of several scenes and overarching chapters each focused around different films. The game also contains subtle hints towards the current generation of Hollywood films such as "Robotomus Crime" a play on the name Optimus Prime from the recent Transformers series of films.

Gameplay

Players will traverse through 5 unique Hollywood-style levels such as an Alien Cyborg invasion, a western cowboy-style town as well as horror themes. The game is a Light gun shooter which utilizes the PlayStation Move for an arcade-style sci-fi Shoot 'em up game. The game is mainly a Rail shooter, however there are also other moves using Move; for instance players have to tilt side to side to dodge oncoming missiles or get a better angle on their shot (the latter usually utilised when enemies hide behind innocent human beings), and lower their gun which hiding behind cover or in preparation for a "quick-draw" duel.

The game differs from its competitors through the use of its special moves, which are gained by putting together consecutive hitstreaks (accuracy streaks are much more important than killing enemies before they can fire) and then activated by performing certain combos. For instance there is the Shockwave blast which can clear an entire screen of enemies by aiming the Move down below the screen, and there is the Rampage rapid fire by aiming above the screen that grants the player a machine gun for a short period of time (without an accuracy penalty). Players can also slow down time by making a full three hundred and sixty degree twist in front of the PlayStation Eye to execute the move.

Reception

Kotaku praised the game's quick and easy take on the shooter genre along with the game's visuals and clever enemy design. Its only criticism was that sometimes controls can feel sluggish. Ars Technica also queried an initial controller lag, but stated that the player soon gets used to it. It also went on to praise the game's price and replay value.

Now Gamer summed up its review by saying "The Shoot  was never going to set the gaming world alight, but it is a charming and  highly enjoyable title at a budget price than anyone with Move should  definitely try."

Digital Chumps closed its review with "If you have the PlayStation Move, you need The Shoot. It's a great, fun addition to the genre and makes good use of the Move controller."

Video game talk show Good Game gave the game a 7 out of 10 saying that the game uses the Move well as well nailing the visuals and having decent replay value.

References

External links
Official page @ PlayStation.com
Cohort Studios Ltd

PlayStation Move-compatible games
PlayStation Move-only games
Rail shooters
PlayStation 3 games
PlayStation 3-only games
Sony Interactive Entertainment games
Video games developed in the United Kingdom
2010 video games
Video games set in Los Angeles
Cohort Studios games
Multiplayer and single-player video games